The following Union Army units and commanders fought in the Second Battle of Ream's Station (August 25, 1864) during the Petersburg campaign of the American Civil War. Order of battle is compiled from the official tabulation of casualties and includes only units which sustained casualties.

Military rank abbreviations used
 MG = Major General
 BG = Brigadier General
 Col = Colonel
 Ltc = Lieutenant Colonel
 Cpt = Captain

Army of the Potomac

II Corps

MG Winfield S. Hancock

Cavalry

References

American Civil War orders of battle